The Fiat BRG was an Italian heavy bomber prototype built in the 1930s by Fiat for the Italian Air Force.

Design and development
The BRG (Bombardiere Rosatelli Gigante, "Giant Rosatelli Bomber") was a three-engine strut-braced high-wing monoplane. It had a deep slab-sided fuselage with one engine in the nose and two strut-mounted engines between the upper wing and a short stub wing attached to the lower fuselage. The BRG had a single fin and rudder and a wide-track landing gear. The pilot and co-pilot had a cabin forward of the wing leading edge. The aircraft was fitted with four machine guns, located in an open dorsal cockpit and a ventral tunnel. After testing in 1931 the prototype BRG was attached to 62 Squadriglia SPB, an experimental heavy bomber squadron.

Operators

Regia Aeronautica
62 Squadrigilia SPB

Specifications

References

The Illustrated Encyclopedia of Aircraft (Part Work 1982-1985), 1985, Orbis Publishing, Page 1780
Picture of BRG (side view)

BRG
1930s Italian bomber aircraft
Trimotors
High-wing aircraft
Aircraft first flown in 1931